Vogue Tyre and Rubber Co., also known as Vogue Tyre,  is an American company providing custom luxury tires, wheels,  and car accessories. The company was founded in 1914 in Chicago, Illinois by Harry Hower and then in 1940, sold to Lloyd O. Dodson who remained its chairman until his death in March 1996. Vogue Tyre invented the whitewall and patented the gold stripe in the 1960s for additional style. Vogue Tyre has been providing custom high-end luxury tires for the last 100 years.

Over the decades, Vogue Tyre has provided custom built tires to professional sports players and movie celebrities like  Gary Cooper, Marion Davies,  Mervyn LeRoy,  Dolores del Río, Paul Whiteman, Kid Rock and more recently Snoop Dogg.

History

Early history: 1913–1960
Harry Hower, a chauffeur in the Chicago area in the early 1900s, got into the tire business and proposed an idea about the whitewall to the Woodbury family. By 1918, the Woodbury's and Harry were in business and the Vogue Tyre Company was born. Over the decades, celebrities and notable people have used Vogue Tyre products on their vehicles with Vogue whitewall tires.

In 1928, Mr. Lloyd Dodson contracted with Vogue Tyre owners Harry Hower and Margaret Woodbury to begin selling their distinctive whitewall tires. When the Great Depression hit in 1929, he turned to the local entertainment industry to sell upscale tires to the movie stars. In 1942, he bought Vogue Tyre and remained its chairman until his death. A selection of these products and list of notable customers are displayed below:

Expansion: 1960 to present

Mr. Lloyd Dodson started his tire business in 1923 and became the exclusive distributor of Vogue Tyres for the western United States. He bought the Chicago-based company during World War II and remained active in the business until his death. He remained active as chairman of the board of directors for the last ten years of his life.

Recent history
- Vogue Tyre acquires some assets of E&G Classics to create E&G Corporation LLC, a new company. This combination positions both companies for substantial growth.

- Hip hop duo Macklemore and Ryan Lewis shoot the music video for their song "White Walls" in a Vogue Tyre warehouse and explicitly mention the company and their tires in the song.

- Snoop shows his 1967 Fleetwood Cadillac "Snoopdeville" on 16-inch Dayton 100-spoke wire wheels and Vogue tires.

Timeline
 1914 — Harry Hower founded Vogue Tyre
 1918 - 1919 — Harry Hower and the Woodburry family create a new tire design called the Whitewall.
 1926 — Vogue expands to the West Coast and Dodson Limited becomes distributor in Los Angeles. 
 1930 — The great depression - Motion pictures stars adopt Vogue Tyres and the only ones that can afford it. Dusenberg owners become primary clients. 
 1938  — Vogue Tyres and Goodyear pair up. Just after its acquisition by Goodyear, Kelly-Springfield Tire Company accepted Mr. Hower's offer and got involved in the production of Vogue Tyres.
 1942 (December) — Dodson Limited owned by Mr. Loyd Dodson acquires Vogues Tyre.
 1945 - 1965 — Vogue Gold Streak and V.S.S. tires are recognized by Rod and Custom magazine as tires of choice in streets and trucks.
 1965 - 1970 — Vogue introduces the Twin Air Preserver Gold Streak Tyre and the Gold Puncture Control Pad.
 1970 - 1975 — Vogue introduces the Wide Track Glass Belt and later the Brougham Gauntlet custom built super steel safety safe tires.
 1975 - 1980 — Kevlar (a.k.a. Aramyd) is invented by Dupont is integrated into Vogue Radials.
 1992 — Vogue introduces the custom built Twin Tread Touring Tyre.
 2000  — Vogue introduces CBR IX with its distinctive sidewall design.

Awards and recognition
 "Consumer digest best buy for passenger car tires" awards in 1993,1994,1995, and 1996
 Lloyd Dodson was inducted into the Tire Industry Hall of Fame in 1990.

See also

Tire manufacturing
Whitewall tire
 List of tire companies

References

Further reading
 Norbye, Jan (November 1972). "The truth about studded tires". Popular Science 201(5): 76–77. Retrieved 29 January 2013.
 "ABC News: Aged Tires Sold as 'New' by Big Retailers". Abcnews.go.com. Retrieved 2010-10-23.
 Sawyers, Harry. "One Day Project: Kid's Backyard Tire Swing". Popular Mechanics. 
 T. E. Baker (2003). Evaluation of the Use of Scrap Tires in Transportation Related Applications in the State of Washington.
 Sullivan, Kate (6 April 2013). "This Day in History: Ford offers whitewall option". Hemmings. 
 Flory, J. Kelly (2008). American cars, 1946-1959: every model, year by year. McFarland. p. 12. .

External links

 National Highway Traffic Safety Adm "Tire Safety" Brochure
 U.S. Government tire rating and maintenance site.
Vogue Tyre & Rubber Company Homepage
Official Vogue Tyre & Rubber Company Facebook Page
Official Vogue Tyre & Facebook Page
Official Vogue Tyre & Rubber Company Twitter Page

Wheel manufacturers
Automotive styling features
Automotive companies established in 1914
Manufacturing companies based in Chicago
Privately held companies based in Illinois
Tire manufacturers of the United States
U.S. Synthetic Rubber Program
1914 establishments in Illinois